La Chapelle-Monthodon is a former commune in the department of Aisne in the Hauts-de-France region of northern France. On 1 January 2016, it was merged into the new commune Vallées-en-Champagne.

Population

See also
Communes of the Aisne department

References

Former communes of Aisne
Aisne communes articles needing translation from French Wikipedia
Populated places disestablished in 2016